Ty'n-y-graig is a hamlet in the  community of Ystrad Meurig, Ceredigion, Wales, which is 65.3 miles (105.2 km) from Cardiff and 170.7 miles (274.8 km) from London. Tynygraig is represented in the Senedd by Elin Jones (Plaid Cymru) and is part of the Ceredigion constituency in the House of Commons.

References

See also
List of localities in Wales by population 

Villages in Ceredigion